Caglio (Valassinese  ) is a comune (municipality) in the Province of Como in the Italian region Lombardy, located about  north of Milan and about  northeast of Como.

Caglio borders the following municipalities: Asso, Caslino d'Erba, Faggeto Lario, Nesso, Rezzago, Sormano.

Demographic evolution

References

Cities and towns in Lombardy